Toledo is a city in Lewis County, Washington, United States. The population was 631 at the 2020 census.

History
Toledo was officially incorporated on October 10, 1892. Toledo was named by Celeste Rochon after a pioneer side wheel paddle steamer operated by Captain Oren Kellogg of the Kellogg Transportation Company. The boat traveled the Cowlitz River. A picture of the riverboat is hanging downtown next to the drugstore. However, it wasn't the first non-Indigenous settlement in Lewis County, as the Pugets Sound Agricultural Company opened and maintained the Cowlitz Farm in 1839, near Toledo.

Geography
Toledo is located at  (46.439283, -122.848191).

Climate
According to the Köppen Climate Classification system, Toledo has a warm-summer Mediterranean climate, abbreviated "Csb" on climate maps.

Demographics

2010 census
As of the census of 2010, there were 725 people, 274 households, and 199 families residing in the city. The racial makeup of the city was 91.0% White, 2.6% Native American, 0.8% Asian, 0.3% Pacific Islander, 2.3% from other races, and 2.9% from two or more races. Hispanic or Latino of any race were 7.0% of the population.

There were 274 households, of which 42.0% had children under the age of 18 living with them, 45.3% were married couples living together, 20.8% had a female householder with no husband present, 6.6% had a male householder with no wife present, and 27.4% were non-families. 22.6% of all households were made up of individuals, and 13.1% had someone living alone who was 65 years of age or older. The average household size was 2.65 and the average family size was 3.04.

The median age in the city was 35.2 years. 28.4% of residents were under the age of 18; 11.4% were between the ages of 18 and 24; 22% were from 25 to 44; 24% were from 45 to 64; and 14.1% were 65 years of age or older. The gender makeup of the city was 46.6% male and 53.4% female.

2000 census
As of the census of 2000, there were 653 people, 265 households, and 182 families residing in the city. The population density was 1,947.3 people per square mile (741.5/km2). There were 283 housing units at an average density of 843.9 per square mile (321.4/km2). The racial makeup of the city was 93.26% White, 0.61% African American, 2.30% Native American, 0.31% Asian, 1.53% from other races, and 1.99% from two or more races. Hispanic or Latino of any race were 4.90% of the population. 18.9% were of American, 13.7% German, 9.9% Irish, 8.0% English and 5.7% Dutch ancestry. 97.5% spoke English and 2.5% Spanish as their first language.

There were 265 households, out of which 32.8% had children under the age of 18 living with them, 51.3% were married couples living together, 12.8% had a female householder with no husband present, and 31.3% were non-families. 28.7% of all households were made up of individuals, and 16.2% had someone living alone who was 65 years of age or older. The average household size was 2.46 and the average family size was 2.95.

In the city, the population was spread out, with 25.7% under the age of 18, 10.7% from 18 to 24, 24.3% from 25 to 44, 22.1% from 45 to 64, and 17.2% who were 65 years of age or older. The median age was 37 years. For every 100 females, there were 85.5 males. For every 100 females age 18 and over, there were 83.7 males.

The median income for a household in the city was $29,271, and the median income for a family was $31,833. Males had a median income of $28,750 versus $19,271 for females. The per capita income for the city was $14,483. About 9.3% of families and 14.7% of the population were below the poverty line, including 21.6% of those under age 18 and 3.8% of those age 65 or over.

Arts and culture

The residents of Toledo hold an annual "Big Toledo Community Meeting", or known locally as the "Big Meeting", to discuss ideas and plans for future events, to be informed of current projects within the town, and to hear about updates by local community and charitable organizations. The meeting began in 2011 as a way to invigorate the town after a large fire devastated a downtown historic building. Recent festivals and celebrations, such as a Santa Quad Parade and the New Year's Eve Giant Cheese Ball Drop, were developed based on proposals from the meeting.

Festivals and events
Toldeo celebrates the city's dairy farming history by hosting an annual Cheese Days festival, usually held in July.  In 2021, the festival observed the 100th occasion that the event had been held since first beginning in 1919. Since 1985, the festival has a grand marshal, titled as the Big Cheese, bestowed to an older and long-term resident of the community as an honor in recognition for their volunteer efforts.

The Mt. St. Helens Bluegrass Festival is held annually in the city and features performances from bluegrass musicians from around the United States, including Appalachia and the Pacific Northwest.  The festival is also known for its bluegrass quilting room.  First debuting in 1984, the weekend event is usually held in August.

Tourism
Gospodor Monument Park, a now closed but roadside-attraction park, is near the city and is viewable from I-5.  The park consists of sculptures on tall plinths and smaller memorials.

Politics
Toledo is a fairly Republican area.

The results for the 2020 U.S. Presidential Election for the Toledo voting districts were as follows:

 Donald J. Trump (Republican) - 201 (59.47%)
 Joe Biden (Democrat) - 121 (35.80%)
 Jo Jorgensen (Libertarian) - 15 (4.44%)

Education

Public education is provided by the Toledo School District, which serves both the City of Toledo and surrounding population.  Campuses for students in elementary, middle, and high school are named after the city.

The first school in Toledo was called the OK School. It was a one-room schoolhouse. Most of the kids that lived out of the town limits had to ride a boat across the river to and from school until the bridge was built. The school district consolidated 33 separate one-room schools in 1922. The school system mascot was the "Indians", a moniker that would exist for a century. The current middle school was originally the high school until the new high school was built in 1974. While the middle school was being remodeled in 1995, the children were relocated for the year to St. Mary's Church and School. 

The Class of 1988 commissioned a totem pole from a chainsaw artist. This pole was presented to the high school by the class and continues to grace the front entrance. Since 1922, the school has used the "Indian" as the School's mascot. The Cowlitz Indian Tribe officially endorsed this mascot by Tribal Council action in February 2019. Artwork in the high school includes two Remington bronzes, an oil portrait of David Ike, last full-blooded Cowlitz Indian and several carvings by indigenous artists. Gary Ike, a long-time supporter of the school and its programs, is honored throughout the school and athletic venues in thanks for his many years of service to the school and community.

In November 2018, the community voted to build a new high school. Using funds from a special state grant and School Construction Assistance Program (SCAP) funding from the Office of Superintendent of Public Instruction, the upgraded high school was constructed on the site of the existing school. Expansive construction of the new Toledo High School began in February 2020 and opened in autumn 2021.  The school is built around the original gymnasium and features artwork honoring the Cowlitz Indian Tribe. The $25 million construction project was completed in April 2022 followed by a ribbon cutting ceremony, unveilings of Native American artworks, and a performance by the Cowlitz Indian Tribe Drum Group.
 
In 2021, the school district, required by a Washington state law banning Native American mascots and imagery enacted that year, changed its nickname to the Riverhawks.

References

Cities in Washington (state)
Cities in Lewis County, Washington